Ron Haydock (April 17, 1940 – August 14, 1977) was an American actor, screenwriter, novelist and rock musician.

Career
Haydock's band, Ron Haydock and the Boppers, were heavily influenced by Gene Vincent. In August 1959, Cha Cha Records released their debut single, "99 Chicks"/"Be-Bop-A Jean." These tunes and 26 other tracks were reissued by Norton Records on the 1996 CD 99 Chicks, which had a vinyl release in 2005.

In the Hollywood B-movie industry, Haydock was an actor and screenwriter, working with director Ray Dennis Steckler. He also worked as a magazine editor. Haydock used a variety of pseudonyms, including Arnold Hayes, Lonnie Lord, Vin Saxon, Don Sheppard and Jerry Lee Vincent. As Vin Saxon, he was the author of adult fiction paperbacks during the 1960s. As Arnold Hayes, he wrote graphic stories for Warren Publishing. Haydock was allegedly responsible for discovering actor Edgar Aghassi and setting him on a career in cult horror films.

In 1966, Haydock, suffering from depression, moved back to Chicago. In 1967, he recorded some acoustic demos, including "Rock Man", with lyrics about Gene Vincent, which was made as a tribute. Through the 1970s he kept writing novels and comics, and continued acting.

On August 14, 1977, Haydock was struck and killed by a truck while hitchhiking after visiting Steckler in Las Vegas; he was 37. Coincidentally, his death happened two days before Elvis Presley. He was buried at Resurrection Catholic Cemetery in Justice, Illinois.

Norton Records' Miriam Linna has written extensively about Haydock for liner notes, magazine articles and the book Sin-A-Rama (2004).

Filmography
Terror in the Snow (1973, never completed) co-starred Edgar Aghassi
Blood Shack (1971) .... Tim 
Body Fever (1969) .... Fritz, the photographer
Rat Pfink a Boo Boo (1966) (as Vin Saxon) .... Lonnie Lord/Rat Pfink
Lemon Grove Kids Meet the Monsters (1965)
The Thrill Killers (1964) (as Tim)

Bibliography

As Vin Saxon

Pagan Urge - 1963 (reissued as God of Lust)
I Want to Sin - 1964
Six For Sex - 1964
Ape Rape - 1964 (reissued in 1967 as Caged Lust) 
Erotic Executives - 1964
Perverted Lust - 1964
Unnatural Desires - 1965
Whisper of Silk - 1966
Sex-a-Reenos - 1966
Pagan Lesbians - 1966
Animal Lust - 1969

As Don Sheppard
The Flesh Peddlers – 1962

References

External links

Discography

1940 births
1977 deaths
American rock musicians
American male screenwriters
Norton Records artists
Road incident deaths in California
Pedestrian road incident deaths
20th-century American musicians
20th-century American male writers
20th-century American screenwriters